TyC Sports is an Argentine pay television sports channel owned by Torneos and Clarín Group, based in Buenos Aires. In Argentina, the channel broadcasts the Argentine B Nacional, CONMEBOL Qualifiers, Argentina national football team friendly matches, Liga Nacional de Básquet, the Argentina Open and other sports. Outside Argentina, the channel broadcasts the Argentine Primera División. It broadcasts in Spanish. In DirecTV Latin America watch on the channel 629, and 1629 in HD.

Channels  
Torneos and the Clarín Group currently operate the domestic pay TV channel TyC Sports, as well as two international pay TV channels TyC Sports.
TyC Sports
TyC Sports 2
TyC Sports 3
TyC Sports 4
TyC Sports Latin America
TyC Sports USA

Programming
FIFA World Cup (Only for Argentina)
Copa America (Only for Argentina) 
CONMEBOL Qualifying (Only for Argentina)
Argentine Primera Division (except Argentina)
Nacional B (All matches for Argentina and some matches for America)
Primera B Metropolitana
Copa Argentina 
Argentina Internationals (Only for Argentina)

Tennis  
Argentina Open (Only for Argentina)
Davis Cup (Only for Argentina)
Fed Cup (Only for Argentina)

Basketball 
Liga Nacional de Básquet 
FIBA World Cup Basketball (Only for Argentina)

Volleyball  
Liga Argentina de Voleibol

Motor Sports 

 TC 2000 
 Top Race

Others 
IAAF World Championships in Athletics
Boxeo de Primera (Live boxing cards every Saturday night, to many countries of the Americas)

News and analysis programming
 Sportia
 Estudio Fútbol
 Planeta Gol
 Domingol
 Líbero
 Esto es Footgolf
 Hay Equipo
 Planeta KO
 Paso a Paso
 Uno contra Uno
 Golpe A Golpe
 Rumbo a Río
 #Bonadeo
 Los especiales de TyC Sports
 Presión alta
 Carburando
 Supermartes

Previous programs 
 TyC Sports Radio  
 Veinticinco
 El Faro
 Noveno Chukker
 Punto Extremo

Match archive programming 

 TyC Sports Clásico

Controversies 
On November of 2022, TyCSports caused an international controversy when, with 4 days to go for the 2022 World Cup, the channel published an online video in which they allegedly made fun of the fact that Chile's men's national association football team did not qualify for that tournament.

See also 
 TyC Sports Internacional

References

External links
 

Television networks in Argentina
Sports television networks